Saramati is a ragam in Carnatic music (musical scale of South Indian classical music). It is a janya rāgam (derived scale) from the 20th melakarta scale Natabhairavi. It is a janya scale, as it does not have all the seven swaras (musical notes) in the descending scale.

Structure and Lakshana 

Saramati is an asymmetric rāgam that does not contain panchamam or rishabham in the descending scale. It is a combination of the sampurna raga scale Natabhairavi and pentatonic scale Hindolam. It is an sampurna-audava rāgam (or owdava rāgam, meaning pentatonic descending scale). Its  structure (ascending and descending scale) is as follows:

 : 
 : 

The notes used in this scale are shadjam, chathusruthi rishabham, sadharana gandharam, panchamam, shuddha dhaivatham and kaisiki nishadham in ascending scale, with panchamam and rishabham dropped in descending scale. For the details of the notations and terms, see swaras in Carnatic music.

Popular compositions
A few compositions have been set to Saramati rāgam.

 Mokshamugalada by Tyagaraja
 Sarasadala nayane by Muthiah Bhagavatar
 Manasaramati by Thanjavur Shankara Iyer
 Unnata Venkata by Thulaseevanam
 Shârade Namaste  and Sâramati Saraswati by Kalyani Varadarajan

 
Music composer Ilaiyaraaja has set the Tyagaraja krithi "Mari Mari Ninne" to this Raga in the movie Sindhu bhairavi, even though the actual krithi is in the raga Kambhoji.

Film Songs

Language:Tamil

Language:Kannada

Related rāgams 
This section covers the theoretical and scientific aspect of this rāgam.

Scale similarities 
Hindolam has a symmetric pentatonic scale, with the notes same as the descending scale of Saramati. Its  structure is S G2 M1 D1 N2 S : S N2 D1 M1 G2 S

Notes

References

Janya ragas